Cameron Martin may refer to:
 Cameron Martin (soccer)
 Cameron Martin (artist)

See also
 Cameron–Martin theorem, a theorem of measure theory